Daniel Smethurst (born 13 October 1990) is a British tennis player and coach, who has played on the ITF Circuit and ATP Challenger Tour. On 23 June 2014 he reached his highest ATP singles ranking of World No. 234 and on 28 July 2014 reached his highest doubles ranking of No. 159.

Smethurst dropped out of ATP rankings in 2017, his last match being against Calvin Hemery in the 2016 Wimbledon Championships qualifiers, where he lost in straight sets. Smethurst became a tennis coach, working with the University of Bath's tennis team. Prior to her retirement, Smethurst worked with former British number one Johanna Konta, as her assistant coach

Challengers and Futures finals

Singles: 27 (12–15)

Doubles: 34 (22–12)

References

External links
 
 

1990 births
Living people
English male tennis players
British male tennis players
Tennis people from Greater Manchester